Helen Naha (1922–1993) was the matriarch in a family of well known Hopi potters.

Biography
Helen Naha was the daughter-in-law of Paqua Naha (the first Frog Woman). Helen was married to Paqua’s son Archie.  She was mostly self-taught, following the style of her mother-in-law and sister-in-law Joy Navasie (second Frog Woman).  Her designs are often based on fragments found at the Awatovi ruins near Hopi. Her hallmark style was finely polished, hand-coiled pottery finished in white slip with black and red decorations. She would often take the extra step to polish the inside of a piece as well as the outside.

She signed her pottery with a feather glyph.  This resulted in her being called “Feather Woman” by many collectors.  Both of her daughters, Sylvia and Rainy (Rainell), as well as her granddaughter Tyra Naha are well known potters.  Today, her medium to larger pots typically sell for several thousand dollars. She has been recognized by the Southwestern Association for Indian Arts for her body of work through the creation of the Helen Naha Memorial Award - For Excellence in Traditional Hopi Pottery.

Naha was a member of the Church of Jesus Christ of Latter-day Saints.

See also

Potter Tyra Naha, her granddaughter

References

 Dillingham, Rick. Fourteen Families in Pueblo Pottery. Foreword by J. J. Brody. University of New Mexico Press, (reprint edition) 1994. 
 Graves, Laura. Thomas Varker Keam, Indian Trader. University of Oklahoma Press, 1998. 
 Pecina, Ron. Hopi Kachinas: History, Legends, and Art. Schiffer Publishing Ltd. 2013.  pp. 163–166.
 Schaaf, Gregory. Hopi-Tewa Pottery, 500 Artist Biographies.  Edited by Richard M. Howard,  CIAC Press, Santa Fe, New Mexico,

External links
Lowell. D. Holmes Museum of Anthropology
Through the Eyes of the Pot:  Southwestern Pottery
ClayHound.us, Examples of Native American Traditional Pottery
PuebloTreasures.com, a free online museum of Southwestern Art
Southwestern Association for Indian Arts

1922 births
1993 deaths
American Latter Day Saint artists
American women ceramists
American ceramists
Artists from Arizona
Hopi people
Native American potters
20th-century American women artists
Native American women artists
Women potters
Latter Day Saints from Arizona
20th-century ceramists
20th-century Native Americans
20th-century Native American women
Native American people from Arizona